Lindsay Eugene Scott (born December 6, 1960) is a former American football wide receiver, who played for the University of Georgia and the New Orleans Saints. He was the 13th overall pick in the 1982 NFL Draft and played four seasons for the Saints.  He was inducted into the Florida–Georgia Hall of Fame in 1997.

Run, Lindsay 

In 1980, during the Florida–Georgia game, deep in their own territory, with a perfect season on the line and only a minute left in the game, Georgia quarterback Buck Belue hit Scott at the Georgia 25-yard-line in stride. Scott darted through Florida's secondary and reached the end zone with only seconds left.

Long-time Georgia radio announcer Larry Munson's play-by-play gave the game and play its name:
Florida in a stand-up five, they may or may not blitz, they won't... Buck back, third down on the eight. In trouble! Got a block behind him... Gonna throw on the run—complete on the 25. To the 30, Lindsay Scott 35, 40, Lindsay Scott 45, 50, 45, 40—Run, Lindsay!--25, 20, 15, 10, 5, Lindsay Scott! Lindsay Scott! Lindsay Scott!!

The game kept alive Georgia's chance for the national title, which they ended up winning.

In 2010 Robbie Burns published Belue to Scott!: The Greatest Moment in Georgia Football History, which details this play.

NFL lawsuit
In May 2012, Scott was one of more than 100 former NFL players that sued the league over brain injuries from concussions.

References

1960 births
Living people
American football wide receivers
Georgia Bulldogs football players
New Orleans Saints players
People from Jesup, Georgia